Convoy ON 166 was the 166th of the numbered ON series of merchant ship convoys Outbound from the British Isles to North America.

Background
As western Atlantic coastal convoys brought an end to the second happy time, Admiral Karl Dönitz, the Befehlshaber der U-Boote (BdU) or commander in chief of U-Boats, shifted focus to the mid-Atlantic to avoid aircraft patrols. Although convoy routing was less predictable in the mid-ocean, Dönitz anticipated that the increased numbers of U-boats being produced would be able to effectively search for convoys with the advantage of intelligence gained through B-Dienst decryption of British Naval Cypher Number 3. However, only 20 percent of the 180 trans-Atlantic convoys sailing from the end of July 1942 until the end of April 1943 lost ships to U-boat attack.

21 February
On 20 February  sighted the convoy scattered by sailing eight days in a northwesterly gale.  torpedoed the straggling Norwegian Stigstad on the morning of 21 February.  was sunk by a No. 120 Squadron RAF B-24 Liberator that afternoon, and Campbell attacked a U-boat that evening. Postwar analysis concluded that Campbell sank , but more recent re-evaluation indicates the attack may have destroyed .

 torpedoed the British Empire Trader at 2032 and the Norwegian NT Nielsen Alonso at 0153 on the night of February 21–22. Both ships were hit by a single torpedo on the port side, flooding the forward hold, and boiler room, respectively.  from the following convoy ONS 167 was ordered to reinforce the convoy escort.

22 February
 torpedoed the British Empire Redshank and American Chattanooga City and Expositor after sunset 22 February, but was damaged by depth charges from the recently arrived Burza. Campbell was disabled in a collision with U-606. Twelve men were rescued from the crew of the sinking U-boat. Burza left the convoy to tow Campbell back to port. The convoy rescue ship Stockport was sunk by U-604 while returning to the convoy after rescuing men from the three ships torpedoed by U-606.

23 February
 torpedoed the Panamanian Winkler at 0420 and Norwegian Glittre at 0425.  torpedoed the American Hastings about 0430 and British Eulima at 0458 on 23 February. Spencer, Rosthern and Chilliwack remained with the convoy and Dianthus left to refuel.

24 February
 torpedoed the Norwegian Ingria at 0520 before dawn on 24 February.  torpedoed the straggling American Liberty ship Jonathan Sturges.

25 February
U-628 hit the British Manchester Merchant with two torpedoes on the starboard side at 0527 before dawn 25 February.

Aftermath
The U-boats discontinued the attack on 26 February. They reached New York City on 3 March 1943.

Ships in convoy

See also
 Convoy Battles of World War II

References

Bibliography
 
 
 
 

ON166
Naval battles of World War II involving Canada
C